Pedro Fernández (born 21 April 1964) is a Cuban sailor. He competed in the men's 470 event at the 1996 Summer Olympics.

References

External links
 

1964 births
Living people
Cuban male sailors (sport)
Olympic sailors of Cuba
Sailors at the 1996 Summer Olympics – 470
People from Ciego de Ávila